Air Vice-Marshal Sir David Munro  (23 June 18788 November 1952) was a Scottish physician, senior Royal Air Force officer, and later Rector of the University of St Andrews.

As Director of the Royal Air Force Medical Service, he pointed out in 1925 that the speed of air travel from countries where infections were endemic to susceptible countries required consideration by public health administration.

Prior to this role, he was in the Indian Medical Service.

He served as Rector of St Andrews University from 1938 to 1946  the longest to have served in this role due to there being no elections during World War II.

References 

1878 births
1952 deaths
Alumni of the University of Edinburgh
20th-century British medical doctors
Royal Air Force Medical Service officers
Rectors of the University of St Andrews